The Hespérides Trough is an undersea trough named for the Spanish research vessel Hespérides. The name was approved by the Advisory Committee on Undersea Features in November 1995.

References

Oceanic basins of the Southern Ocean